Warren Lemuel Miller   (1885–1956) was an outfielder in Major League Baseball. Nicknamed "Gitz", he played for the Washington Senators in 1909 and 1911.

External links

1885 births
1956 deaths
Major League Baseball outfielders
Washington Senators (1901–1960) players
Baseball players from Pennsylvania
Williamsport Millionaires players
Scranton Miners players
Mobile Sea Gulls players
Albany Senators players